Aghalurcher is a civil parish located mainly in the barony of Magherastephana in County Fermanagh and partly in the barony of Clogher in County Tyrone, Northern Ireland.

Townlands of Aghalurcher in County Fermanagh
The parish comprises the following 239 townlands in County Fermanagh:

Acres
Aghacramphill
Aghalurcher Glebe
Aghamore North
Aghamore South
Aghavoory
Agheeghter
Aghinure
Aghnaskew
Altagoaghan
Altawark
Altmartin
Altnaponer
Atnamollyboy
Attybaron
Attyclannabryan
Ballymacaffry
Ballymakenny
Barnhill
Bohattan
Boleyhill
Brobrohan
Bunnahesco
Bunnahola Island
Carrickawick
Carrickmacosker
Carricknabrattoge
Carrickpolin
Carrowgarragh
Carrowhony
Castle Balfour Demesne
Cavanagarvan
Cavanaleck
Claraghy
Clay
Cleen
Cleenriss
Clonmacfelimy
Coalhill
Colebrook Demesne
Comaghy
Congo
Coolaran
Coolbeg
Coolcrannel
Coollane
Cooltrane
Cooneen
Corfannan
Corlacky
Corlough
Cornakessagh
Cornarooslan
Cornashannel
Cornashee
Corrachrow
Corraclare
Corradillar
Corralongford
Corranewy
Corrard
Cran
Creaghamanone Island
Creaghanameelta Island
Creaghanarourke Island
Creaghanchreesty Island
Creaghawaddy Island
Croaghan
Crockadreen
Crockaness
Crocknagowan
Crocknagrally
Crocknanane
Crummy
Curragh
Curraghfad
Currogs
Curryann
Cushwash
Derrintony
Derryasna
Derrychaan
Derrychulla
Derrycorban
Derrycrum
Derrycullion
Derryhurdin
Derryloman
Derrynavogy
Derryree
Doocharn
Dooederny
Doogary
Dooross
Drumany
Drumbad Beg
Drumbad More
Drumbaghlin
Drumbrughas North
Drumbrughas South
Drumcon
Drumcoo
Drumcramph
Drumcrin
Drumcru
Drumcunny
Drumgoon
Drumguiff
Drumhack
Drumharriff
Drumhaw
Drumleagues Big
Drumleagues Little
Drumliff
Drumlught
Drummack
Drummeer
Drumroo
Drumroosk
Ederdacurragh
Edergole
Edergole Island
Erdinagh
Eshanummer
Eshbane
Eshbralley
Eshcarcoge
Eshmeen
Eshnagorr
Eshnascreen
Eshnasillog Beg
Eshnasillog More
Eshthomas
Eskeragh
Farranaconaghy
Farranacurky
Farranasculloge
Foglish
Forfey
Friar's Island
Garvaghy
Garvoghill
Geddagh Island
Glasdrumman
Gortacharn
Gortgarran
Grogey
Henrystughan
Hollybrook
Inishcorkish
Inishcreenry (Island)
Inishfausy
Inishleague (Island)
Irishcollan
Inishore
Inishroosk
Inishturk
Keenaghy
Killarbran
Killashanbally
Killybane
Killycloghy
Killycrutteen
Killygullan
Killynamph
Killypaddy
Killyrover
Kilmore North
Kilmore South
Kilronan
Kiltenamullagh
Kingstown
Kinmore
Knocks
Knocks
Lebally
Legatillida
Leraw
Lisadearny
Lisduff
Lislea
Lisnagole
Lisoneill
Littlehill
Longfield
Lough Hill
Lurganbane
Macknagh
Millwood
Moneymakinn
Moneyneddy
Mongibbaghan
Moughley
Mountjoy Island
Mullaghfad
Mullaghkeel or Ballymackilroy
Mullaghmakervy
Mullaghmore
Mullynaburtlan
Mullynascarty
Mullynavale
Munville
Naan Island South
Oghill
Owenskerry
Rabbit Island
Rafintan
Ramult
Raw
Rossbeg
Rossgad
Rossmacaffry
Rossmacall
Rossmacole
Shanaghy
Sheebeg
Slush Hill
Sraharory
Stripe
Tatteevagh
Tattenabuddagh
Tattenaheglish
Tattenalee
Tattinderry
Tattynuckle
Tattyreagh
Tireeghan
Tirenny
Toney
Trahanacarrick Island
Trannish (Island)
Tully North
Tully South
Tullykenneye
Tullyneevin

Townlands of Aghalurcher in County Tyrone
The parish comprises the following 17 townlands in County Tyrone:

Alderwood
Artclea
Beagh
Breakly
Crockacleaven
Crocknahull
Cullentra
Cullynane
Kill
Kiltermon
Loughermore Glebe
Mullaghmore
Rahack Glebe
Relessy
Tattanellan
Timpany
Tircar

See also
List of civil parishes of County Fermanagh
List of civil parishes of County Tyrone
List of townlands in County Fermanagh
List of townlands in County Tyrone

References